Isolabona is a comune (municipality) in the Province of Imperia in the Italian region Liguria, located about  southwest of Genoa and about  west of Imperia.

Isolabona borders the following municipalities: Apricale, Castelvittorio, Dolceacqua, Pigna and Rocchetta Nervina.

Demographic evolution

References

Cities and towns in Liguria